Henry Felipe Mercedes Pérez (born July 23, 1969 in Santo Domingo, Dominican Republic) is a former Major League Baseball catcher who played for five seasons in the American League.

After making an impressive Major League debut with the Oakland Athletics at the end of the 1992 season, going 4 for 5 (.800) on the season with a triple, he again played for the Athletics in 1993, followed by stints with the Kansas City Royals from 1995 to 1996 and the Texas Rangers in 1997.

External links

1969 births
Living people
Dominican Republic expatriate baseball players in the United States
Kansas City Royals players

Major League Baseball catchers
Major League Baseball players from the Dominican Republic
Oakland Athletics players
Texas Rangers players
Toros del Este players
Águilas Cibaeñas players
Arizona League Athletics players
Cafeteros de Córdoba players
Dominican Republic expatriate baseball players in Mexico
Fresno Grizzlies players
Indianapolis Indians players
Madison Muskies players
Memphis Redbirds players
Modesto A's players
Oklahoma City 89ers players
Omaha Golden Spikes players
Omaha Royals players
Southern Oregon A's players
Tacoma Tigers players
Vaqueros Laguna players